Dejan Lekić (Serbian Cyrillic: Дејан Лекић; born 7 June 1985) is a Serbian footballer who plays for Spanish club Las Rozas CF as a striker.

Career
After appearing for Metalac Kraljevo and Zemun, Lekić joined Red Star Belgrade in the 2009 summer, after scoring 26 goals with Zemun in the 2008–09 campaign. He made his debut for the club on 16 July 2009, starting in a 1–0 away win against NK Rudar Velenje, for the season's UEFA Europa League.

On 6 August 2009, in a third qualifying round match against Dinamo Tbilisi, Lekić scored an own goal which gave Dinamo a two-goal margin, but later netted a hat-trick for Red Star as the club claimed their place in the play-offs.

On 25 June 2010 Lekić signed a five-year deal with La Liga side CA Osasuna, for a € 2.6 million fee. He made his debut in the competition on 29 August, coming on as a second-half substitute in a 0–0 home draw against UD Almería; he scored his first goal on 23 January of the following year, in a 2–3 away loss against the same team.

On 13 January 2012, Lekić scored a first-half goal in a 1–2 home loss against FC Barcelona for the campaign's Copa del Rey. Roughly a month later, also against the Catalans, he scored a brace in the surprising 3-2 home success.

In July 2012, after two years playing in Spain, Lekić rescinded his link with the Navarrese outfit, and signed for Turkish Gençlerbirliği. In August 2013, he agreed a one-year loan to Sporting de Gijón, team of the Spanish Segunda División. He eventually returned to his parent club, rescinding his link in August 2014.

On 1 September 2014, Lekić signed a one-year deal with SD Eibar, newly promoted to the top level. After making only one start during the whole campaign and with his side ending in the relegation places, he left the club.

On 11 November 2015, Lekić signed a deal with Indian club Atlético de Kolkata midway through the second ISL season.

On 30 December 2015 Lekić moved back to Spain, signing for Girona FC in the second tier. On 11 August of the following year, he was transferred to fellow league team RCD Mallorca.

On 1 September 2017, free agent Lekić signed for CF Reus Deportiu. Roughly one year later, he moved to fellow second division side Cádiz CF on a one-year contract. He left the club on 31 August 2019.

On 29 January 2020, he moved to CD Atlético Baleares. After two appearances, he left the club on 1 August 2020.

International career
Lekić has been a member of the Serbian national team since 2009.

Career statistics

Honours
Red Star
 Serbian Cup: 2009–10

References

External links
 
 
 

1985 births
Living people
Sportspeople from Kraljevo
Serbian footballers
Association football forwards
FK Zemun players
Red Star Belgrade footballers
CA Osasuna players
Sporting de Gijón players
SD Eibar footballers
Girona FC players
RCD Mallorca players
CF Reus Deportiu players
Cádiz CF players
Las Rozas CF players
Gençlerbirliği S.K. footballers
ATK (football club) players
CD Atlético Baleares footballers
Süper Lig players
Serbian SuperLiga players
La Liga players
Segunda División players
Segunda División B players
Indian Super League players
Serbia international footballers
Serbian expatriate footballers
Expatriate footballers in India
Serbian expatriate sportspeople in India
Expatriate footballers in Spain
Serbian expatriate sportspeople in Spain
Expatriate footballers in Turkey
Serbian expatriate sportspeople in Turkey